Fairfield Plaza, Inc. v. Commissioner, 39 T.C. 706 (1963) was a case before the United States Tax Court discussing timing alternatives in taxing the return of capital.

Background

Facts
The taxpayer purchased a piece of land, divided it into two tracts, and made certain improvements.

The taxpayer sold both of the tracts of land in different years and allocated his basis between the two tracts based upon area. The taxpayer also allocated certain amounts that had been placed into escrow between the two tracts. The amounts in escrow were for improvements to the tract that was sold last.

Tax return
The IRS determined that the taxpayer improperly allocated these allocations in its tax return.

Issues
The taxpayer challenged the IRS's determination, claiming that the IRS erroneously determined the proper allocation of his basis between the two tracts of land and that the IRS erroneously allocated the amounts that were placed in escrow for improvements between the two tracts of land.

Opinion of the court

The court affirmed, finding that the allocation of basis was not proper within the meaning of Treas. Reg. § 1.61-6, reasoning that:
the relative values of the two tracts were different
the tract that was sold last was of a greater value
the taxpayer was not entitled to allocate the amounts placed into escrow between the two tracts of land. The court reasoned that the amounts in question were used for improvements to the tract that was sold last.

References

United States Tax Court cases
United States taxation and revenue case law
1963 in United States case law